The 2022 UCI Cycling Esports World Championships was the second edition of the UCI Cycling Esports World Championships, the annual world championships for esport road bicycle racing. It was held on 26 February 2022 on the platform Zwift. Regional qualifiers took place 27–28 November 2021.

Along with professional riders, invited by their respective national cycling organisations to compete in the championships, Zwift held a number of qualification events. The first round Continental Open event series was open to all eligible riders in the Zwift community. The second round of Continental Qualifiers then determined those community riders that won a place in the UCI Cycling Esports World Championships in February 2022.

The men's race was won by 2020 Zwift Academy winner Jay Vine, while the women's race was won by Loes Adegeest.

Qualifiers

Schedule

Results

Men's race

Women's race

References

External links 
 UCI Cycling Esports World Championships live-streamed video
 New Scotland Map In Upcoming UCI 2023 World Championship.